Persoonia volcanica is a species of flowering plant in the family Proteaceae and is endemic to eastern Australia. It is an erect shrub with hairy young branchlets, egg-shaped to oblong leaves, and yellow flowers borne in groups of up to twenty on a rachis up to  that usually continues to grow after flowering, each flower with a leaf at its base.

Description
Flowering mainly occurs from December to February and the fruit is a green drupe.

Taxonomy and naming
Persoonia volcanica was first formally described in 1991 by Peter H. Weston and Lawrie Johnson from a specimen collected near Woodenbong in 1989 and the description was published in Telopea. The specific epithet (volcanica) is a reference to the substrate on which this species usually grows.

Distribution and habitat
This geebung grows in forest and the margins of rainforest on the McPherson Range on the New South Wales-Queensland border and disjunctly in Kroombit Tops National Park further north.

References

volcanica
Flora of New South Wales
Flora of Queensland
Plants described in 1991
Taxa named by Lawrence Alexander Sidney Johnson
Taxa named by Peter H. Weston